Will Manso (born February 20, 1975 in Weehawken, New Jersey, United States) is an American TV journalist and host.  He is currently the WPLG Local 10 sports director and lead sports anchor, as well as reporter and Miami Heat studio host for road broadcasts on Bally Sports Sun in Miami, Florida.

Career
The 2017–2018 season will mark Will Manso's 5th as a member of the Miami HEAT broadcast
team. He joins the Fox studio for road games on Fox Sports Sun as the pre-game, halftime
and post-game host and also works a number of home games in a reporter capacity, doing
interviews with assistant coaches and postgame hits outside the opposing locker room. In
addition to his HEAT duties, Manso is the Sports Director at WPLG (ABC) in Miami and also
serves as a host for primetime specials that air on WPLG.
Manso began his on-air career in 1996 as a sportscaster at UMTV, the student produced
news station for the University of Miami. He helped develop a half-hour sports show called
"Sportsdesk" and also anchored and reported for the school's newscast, Newsvision.
The New Jersey native left Miami for his first professional job in 1997 as the Weekend Sports Anchor/Reporter at
KPAX-TV in Missoula, Montana. He later worked for the now defunct WOTV (ABC) in Battle Creek, Michigan in 1998,
before getting a job at WPLG in March 1999. Manso has served as a Weekend Sports Anchor/Reporter, News Anchor/
Reporter and Specials Host at WPLG. He was promoted to the position of Sports Director at WPLG in 2007.
A proud Cuban-American,
he is involved in a number of community events and often speaks at local schools. He also emcees numerous events
throughout the year and is a member of the National Association of Hispanic Journalism.

He was promoted to the position of sports director at WPLG in 2007, after his predecessor, former Miami Dolphin Jimmy Cefalo, resigned his position to manage a wine business. In addition to his duties as sports reporter, he also hosted the WPLG singing competition show called "Gimme the Mic."

Manso has served as Emcee of the South Beach Wine & Food Festival, Florida.

In 2009, he was voted in a Miami Herald poll as the most popular sportscaster in the Miami-Ft. Lauderdale TV market. Manso has also served as a guest fill-in host on WQAM radio in Miami and 790 the ticket.i.

In 2017, he was voted the best sportscaster in Miami by the Miami New Times.

References

External links
 "People & Personalities: Pang Joins Blues As TV Analyst" Sportsbusinessdaily.com
 "Jimmy Cefalo To Leave WPLG" Sfltv.com

1975 births
Living people
American people of Cuban descent
American television reporters and correspondents
University of Miami alumni
People from Weehawken, New Jersey